A scholarch (scholarchēs) was the head of a school in ancient Greece. The term is especially remembered for its use to mean the heads of schools of philosophy, such as the Platonic Academy in ancient Athens. Its first scholarch was Plato himself, the founder and proprietor. He held the position for forty years, appointing his nephew Speusippus as his successor. The members of the Academy elected later scholarchs.

A list of scholarchs of the four main philosophy schools during the Hellenistic period, with the approximate dates they headed the schools, is as follows:

Notes

Education in ancient Greece

Ancient Greek titles